Red State is a documentary film by Michael Shea. The film follows the director into America's red states (those with predominantly Republican voters) to find out why so many Americans chose to re-elect President George W. Bush in the 2004 presidential elections.

External links
 
 

2006 films
Documentary films about elections in the United States
American documentary films
2006 documentary films
2004 United States presidential election in popular culture
Films about George W. Bush
2000s English-language films
2000s American films